Ricardo Valinotti (born 4 May 1960, in Asunción, Paraguay) is a Paraguayan former footballer, who played as a forward.

Club play 
Valinotti started his professional career with Club Libertad, in the 1978 Paraguayan Primera División season. After eight seasons with Libertad, Valinotti joined Club Sol de América for their national championship 1986 Paraguayan Primera División season. In 1989 he was signed by Sport Colombia, then joined Atlántida in 1992, retiring with them in 1995.

International 
Valinotti was a member of the Paraguay national U-20 squad that competed in the 1979 FIFA World Youth Championship and was also part of the Paraguay national football team that participated in the 1983 Copa América.

References

External links
 
 

1960 births
Living people
Paraguayan footballers
Club Libertad footballers
Club Sol de América footballers
Sport Colombia footballers
Paraguayan Primera División players
1983 Copa América players
People from Central Department
Association football midfielders
Paraguay international footballers
Atlántida Sport Club players